Men's 10 metre air rifle was one of the thirteen shooting events at the 1992 Summer Olympics. It was the first Olympic competition after the introduction of the new target in 1989, and thus two Olympic records were set, both by the new Olympic champion, Yuri Fedkin.

Qualification round

OR Olympic record – Q Qualified for final

Final

OR Olympic record

References

Sources

Shooting at the 1992 Summer Olympics
Men's events at the 1992 Summer Olympics